Omobranchus aurosplendidus is a species of combtooth blenny found in the Northwest Pacific ocean, around China and Macau.

References

aurosplendidus
Taxa named by John Richardson (naturalist)
Fish described in 1846